LGBT people in Brazil represent an estimated 8.35% of the Brazilian population, or approximately 20,000,000 people.

Demographics

Demographic research 
A 2009 survey conducted by University of São Paulo revealed 7.8% of Brazilian males identified as gay and 2.6% identified as bisexual, for a total of 10.4% of the male population. Lesbians comprised 4.9% of the population and bisexual women comprised 1.4%, for a total of 6.3% of the female population.

The sex composition of the LGBT population is distributed as follows: 64% male and 36% female. The composition of declared sexual orientation of the study population is distributed as follows: 54% said were gay, 28% said were lesbian, 17% said were bisexual, 1% did not fit in any of the above. The education of the LGBT population is distributed as follows: 57% have higher degree (university or college) complete, 40% have high school (school) complete. The composition of housing condition of the LGBT population is distributed as follows: 52% live with parents or relatives, 22% live with partners, 20% live alone, 6% live with friends.

In 2010, a survey conducted by Ministry of Health of Brazil revealed that the Brazilian gay population has more money than heterosexual population. The homosexuals were: A and B classes, 26.9%, C class, 49.9%, D and E classes, 23.2%. The heterosexuals were: A and B classes, 18.2%, C class, 47.8%, D and E classes 34%.In 2007, a survey conducted by Insearch revealed that gays of Brazil spend 40% more on items related to leisure than heterosexuals. 84% traveled to Brazil four times over the past 12 months and 36% went abroad in the last three years. The Brazilian gays also read more, 88% read newspapers, and 94% read magazines. 73% have a habit of go to the movies three times a month on average, 46% go to the theater once a month and 57% buy eight books a year. Surpassing the national average.

Approximately 80% of Brazilian LGBTs reside in large cities, 20% came from  interior. The large cities of Brazil, known as gay-friendly, often contain a number of gay-oriented establishments, such as gay bars and pubs, gay nightclubs, gay bathhouses and gay restaurants. The most famous gay village of São Paulo is the Frei Caneca Street and in Rio is the Farme de Amoedo Street.

By city

Same-sex couples 

Same-sex relationships in the same home by Brazilian regions, according to the 2010 IBGE Census:

GDP per capita 
Same-sex couples had more GDP per capita (annual) than Opposite-sex couples, according to the 2010 IBGE Census:

See also

 LGBT rights in the Americas
 LGBT rights in Brazil
 LGBT people
 Gay village
São Paulo Gay Pride Parade
Beyond Carnival by James N. Green

References

LGBT in Brazil
Demographics of Brazil